Excelsior Public School is a former school building in Excelsior, Minnesota, United States, listed on the National Register of Historic Places.  The school was built in the Georgian Revival style between 1899 and 1901 to serve Excelsior during a time of growth in the community.  Before this building was built, two other school buildings were located on the site.  The first was moved to 321-323 Third Street, and the second was destroyed by fire.

The building originally housed grades 1 through 7 in four classrooms on the first floor, and eighth-grade and high school students were on the second floor.  At the time of its construction, it was deemed the finest school in rural Hennepin County.  By 1908, the school served 308 students, and by 1915 the high school students had moved to a new building on Oak Street.

The school bell, mounted in a bell tower, had to be removed from the tower in 1962 because of a decaying structure.  It was mounted on a granite pedestal next to the Excelsior Public Library in 1966.  In 1964, the school was closed, and later became administrative offices for the Minnetonka School District.  The building is currently used for office space.

References

External links
 History of the current Excelsior Elementary School

Buildings and structures in Hennepin County, Minnesota
Defunct schools in Minnesota
Former school buildings in the United States
National Register of Historic Places in Hennepin County, Minnesota
School buildings completed in 1901
School buildings on the National Register of Historic Places in Minnesota
1901 establishments in Minnesota